A Lion in the Meadow is the first children's book written by the New Zealand author Margaret Mahy. Illustrations done by London artist, Jenny Williams. The book was first published in 1969 and won the 1975 Esther Glen Award. It was also one of the books chosen to accompany Mahy's 2002 Hans Christian Andersen Award nomination. The book was reissued in 1989 with a kinder ending.

Plot 
A Lion in the Meadow follows a little boy who believes there is a lion living in a meadow behind his house.

Art 
The art work presented is captured in many unique ways. It fumbles upon distinctive swirls, shapes, and colors that emphasizes the story line. The pictures by Jenny Williams has a slightly trippy vibe. With bold swirls and pinks, oranges and purples reflect the little boy's imagination and are mirrored by the mother's clothes and interior decor in the house.

Themes 
The theme of the story is surrounded around the idea of over parenting, and taking a over bearing stance on child development. One where the parent tries to limit and restrict the imagination of the child.

Culture

References
4. “A Lion in the Meadow.” Hachette Aotearoa New Zealand, www.hachette.co.nz/book/?id=a-lion-in-the-meadow-9781869713904.              

5. Bloomfield, Jenny. “Jenny's Picture Book Review: 'a Lion in the Meadow' by Margaret Mahy and Jenny Williams.” Bloomfield & Rolfe, Bloomfield & Rolfe, 28 Apr. 2013, https://www.bloomfieldandrolfe.com/blog/2013/3/29/jennys-picture-book-review-a-lion-in-the-meadow-by-margaret-mahy-and-jenny-williams.   

1969 children's books
New Zealand children's books
Children's fiction books
Adventure fiction
Drama by medium
Fantasy books
English-language books
Books about lions
Fictional children
Books about dragons
Anthropomorphic animals
Children's books about friendship
New Zealand in fiction
Forests in fiction
Fiction set in 1969
Books by Margaret Mahy